Kuliai (Samogitian: Kulē) is a town in Telšiai County, Lithuania. According to the 2011 census, the town has a population of 625 people.

History
In June 1941, the local Lithuanian collaborators arrested the Jewish inhabitants of the town. 85 Jews were murdered in a mass execution.

Famous people
 Yosef Shlomo Kahaneman, a renowned rabbi was born in the town in 1886
 Nosson Meir Wachtfogel, a renowned rabbi was born in the town in 1910

References

Towns in Lithuania
Towns in Telšiai County
Plungė District Municipality
Telshevsky Uyezd
Holocaust locations in Lithuania